The 11th Annual Honda Civic Tour was a concert tour co-headlined by the American alternative metal bands Linkin Park and Incubus. They were joined by Mutemath, a supporting act for the tour. The tour started on August 10, 2012 and ended on September 10, 2012.

This tour was the 11th tour in the Honda Civic Tour lineup, and was the shortest, going to 17 dates.

Background
Announced on April 16, 2012 by Honda, the 2012 Honda Civic Tour featured Linkin Park, Incubus, and Mutemath. The tour started in Bristow, Virginia, and ended in Chula Vista, California.

As a tradition with all previous Honda Civic Tours, Linkin Park was chosen to design a Honda Civic Si and a CBR250R motorcycle. The band chose to base the cars artwork off their album they had just released, Living Things.

Opening act
Mutemath

Setlist

Tour dates

Incubus did not play until 8/14/12.

References

External links
Linkin Park Official Website
Incubus Official Website

2012 concert tours
Co-headlining concert tours
Incubus (band)
Linkin Park concert tours